Predrag Štromar (born 13 January 1969) is a Croatian politician who served as Minister of Construction and Physical Planning and Deputy Prime Minister in the Government of Croatia from 2017 to 2020. He previously served as president of the Croatian People's Party from May to December 2020.

Early life
Born in Vinica, Štromar attended secondary school in Varaždin. He graduated at the Zagreb Faculty of Economics and Business in 1993.

Political career
As a Croatian People's Party candidate, Štromar was elected as prefect of Varaždin County in the 2009 election. In the 2013 election, Štromar was re-elected, while following the 2017 election, Radimir Čačić succeeded him as prefect. From 2016 to 2017, Štromar served as deputy president of the HNS, while between June and December 2017, he served as acting party president.

On 9 June 2017, Štromar was appointed as Minister of Construction and Spatial Planning and Deputy Prime Minister in the cabinet of prime minister Andrej Plenković. On 24 May 2020, Štromar was elected as president of the HNS.

Personal life
Born in the village of Vinica based in Varaždin County, Štromar is married with two daughters. Apart from his native Croatian, he is fluent in English.

See also 
 Cabinet of Andrej Plenković

References

1969 births
Living people
Government ministers of Croatia
Croatian politicians
People from Varaždin County
Faculty of Economics and Business, University of Zagreb alumni
Representatives in the modern Croatian Parliament